Peter Elliott (born 14 June 1941) is a retired English Anglican priest who was the  Archdeacon of Northumberland from 1993 to 2005.

Elliott was educated at the Queen Elizabeth Grammar School in Horncastle and Hertford College, Oxford. He was ordained in 1965. Following curacies at All Saints' Church, Gosforth, and St Peter's, Balkwell, he held incumbencies in Elswick, North Gosforth and Embleton before his appointment as an archdeacon.

References

1941 births
Alumni of Hertford College, Oxford
Archdeacons of Northumberland
Living people